is a railway station in Itoshima, Fukuoka Prefecture, Japan. It is operated by JR Kyushu and is on the Chikuhi Line.

Lines
Only local services on the Chikuhi Line stop at this station.

Station layout 
The station consists of an island platform serving two tracks. The station facilities are in hashigami format, the automatic ticket vending machines and ticket gate being located on a bridge which leads to the platform from the access road.

Adjacent stations

History
By 1 April 1924, the line had been extended east to Maebaru (today ). Kafuri was opened on the same day as an intermediate station on the new track. When the Kitakyushu Railway was nationalized on 1 October 1937, Japanese Government Railways (JGR) took over control of the station and designated the line which served it as the Chikuhi Line. With the privatization of Japanese National Railways (JNR), the successor of JGR, on 1 April 1987, control of the station passed to JR Kyushu.

The station became unstaffed in 2016.

Passenger statistics
In fiscal 2016, the station was used by an average of 673 passengers daily (boarding passengers only), and it ranked 208th among the busiest stations of JR Kyushu.

Environs
Itoshima City Kafuri Elementary School

See also
 List of railway stations in Japan

References

External links
Kafuri Station (JR Kyushu)

Railway stations in Japan opened in 1924
Chikuhi Line
Railway stations in Fukuoka Prefecture
Stations of Kyushu Railway Company